The 1946 Brooklyn Dodgers finished the season tied for first place with the St. Louis Cardinals. The two teams played in the first ever playoff series to decide the pennant, and the Cardinals took two straight to win the title.

With their star players back from the war, Brooklyn had jumped back into serious contention. They would be respectable until their move to Los Angeles 10 years later.

This season was the team's – and Major League Baseball's – last non-integrated one.

Offseason 
On October 23, 1945, the Dodgers signed Jackie Robinson as a free agent. Robinson was the first black player to be officially a part of a major league organization in over 60 years, since the barring of Fleet and Welday Walker in 1884. For the 1946 season, Robinson was assigned to the Montreal Royals, the Dodgers' top farm team.

Later in the offseason, the Dodgers signed two more players from the Negro leagues, Roy Campanella and Don Newcombe, who were assigned to the Nashua Dodgers.

Regular season

Season standings

Record vs. opponents

Opening Day lineup

Notable transactions 

 April 27, 1946: Jack Graham and Goody Rosen were purchased from the Dodgers by the New York Giants.
 June 12, 1946: Don Padgett was purchased from the Dodgers by the Boston Braves.
 June 15, 1946: Billy Herman was traded by the Dodgers to the Boston Braves for Stew Hofferth.

Roster

Player stats

Batting

Starters by position 
Note: Pos = Position; G = Games played; AB = At bats; H = Hits; Avg. = Batting average; HR = Home runs; RBI = Runs batted in

Other batters 
Note: G = Games played; AB = At bats; H = Hits; Avg. = Batting average; HR = Home runs; RBI = Runs batted in

Pitching

Starting pitchers 
Note: G = Games pitched; IP = Innings pitched; W = Wins; L = Losses; ERA = Earned run average; SO = Strikeouts

Other pitchers 
Note: G = Games pitched; IP = Innings pitched; W = Wins; L = Losses; ERA = Earned run average; SO = Strikeouts

Relief pitchers 
Note: G = Games pitched; W = Wins; L = Losses; SV = Saves; ERA = Earned run average; SO = Strikeouts

Awards and honors 
1946 Major League Baseball All-Star Game
Dixie Walker starter
Kirby Higbe reserve
Pee Wee Reese reserve
Pete Reiser reserve

League top five finishers 
Kirby Higbe
 #2 in NL in strikeouts (134)
 #3 in NL in wins (17)

Pete Reiser
 MLB leader in stolen bases (34)

Eddie Stanky
 #3 in NL in runs scored (98)

Dixie Walker
 #2 in NL in RBI (116)
 #3 in NL in batting average (.319)

Farm system 

LEAGUE CHAMPIONS: Montreal, Nashua, Newport News, Trois-Rivières, Zanesville

Notes

References 
Baseball-Reference season page
Baseball Almanac season page

External links 
1946 Brooklyn Dodgers uniform
Brooklyn Dodgers reference site
Acme Dodgers page 
Retrosheet

Los Angeles Dodgers seasons
Brooklyn Dodgers season
Brooklyn Dodgers season
1940s in Brooklyn
Flatbush, Brooklyn